The Weinberg S.E.5a Replica is an American homebuilt biplane that was designed by William Weinberg of Kansas City, Missouri. The aircraft was supplied in the form of plans for amateur construction, but the plans seem to no longer be available.

The Weinberg S.E.5a Replica is an 80% replica of the First World War Royal Aircraft Factory S.E.5a fighter aircraft.

Design and development
Like the original S.E.5a fighter, the S.E.5a Replica features a biplane layout, a single-seat open cockpit, fixed conventional landing gear and a single engine in tractor configuration.

The aircraft is predominantly made from wood with the aft fuselage and tail made from welded steel tubing. The  span wings are built with wooden spars, wooden ribs and center-section. The wings, tail and aft fuselage are covered in doped aircraft fabric, with the forward fuselage covered in plywood. There is a small baggage compartment behind the pilot's seat.

With full fuel of  the payload is only .

Operational history
At least one example was constructed in 1970 and registered with the US Federal Aviation Administration as an Experimental - Amateur-built. The aircraft was removed from the registry on 30 April 2016.

Specifications (S.E.5a Replica)

References

S.E.5a Replica
1970s United States sport aircraft
Single-engined tractor aircraft
Biplanes
Homebuilt aircraft